Greenwood is a historic home located near Orange, Orange County, Virginia. It was built about 1820, and is a two-story, three bay, timber frame Federal style I-house with a side gable roof. It has a center-passage plan, a raised basement, and two exterior-end chimneys. The Greek Revival style front entry porch has brick piers supporting a one-story wooden porch with a gable roof and triangular pediment supported by square paired columns.  A one-bay, single-pile timber-frame wing addition, built about 1850. Also on the property are a contributing outbuilding, well, and the grave of Mary Roberta Macon who died at age nine in 1847.

It was listed on the National Register of Historic Places in 1992.

References

Houses on the National Register of Historic Places in Virginia
Houses completed in 1820
Federal architecture in Virginia
Greek Revival houses in Virginia
Houses in Orange County, Virginia
National Register of Historic Places in Orange County, Virginia